Rappach may refer to:
Rappach (Kahl), a river of Bavaria, Germany, tributary of the Kahl
Rappach Water, upper reaches of the River Einig of Scotland, tributary of the River Oykel 
Rappach, a district of the community Mömbris in Bavaria, Germany